Allen Morris Thomas (born July 5, 1969) is an American politician. He was appointed on December 6, 2021 by President Biden and the White House as Regional Administrator for the Southeast Region of the United States Small Business Administration. 

The SBA Southeast Region guaranteed over $8 billion in small business loans in fiscal year 2021, counseled over 400,000 entrepreneurs, and awarded nearly $18 billion in federal contracts to small business to help drive their success.

As Region IV Administrator, Allen oversees SBA programs, offices, and operations in the SBA’s Southeast region, serving Alabama, Florida, Georgia, Kentucky, Mississippi, North Carolina, South Carolina, and Tennessee.

Allen is a former three-term mayor, businessman, entrepreneur, and leader in public and private enterprise. As mayor of Greenville, one of North Carolina’s largest cities, Allen led the post-recession recovery, rapid expansion, and robust economic growth, better connecting the city and region. He was recognized by the White House during the Obama-Biden Administration for community engagement in law enforcement and public safety.

A serial entrepreneur, Allen co-founded healthcare technology startup IQMax, which grew to service 160 medical facilities in 36 states, processing 18 million patient records per day. He was appointed Executive Director of the North Carolina Global TransPark by North Carolina Governor Roy Cooper to revitalize the state’s global multimodal transportation and logistics hub, thus spearheading growth in advanced manufacturing jobs, innovation, and investment.

Allen served as the mayor of Greenville, North Carolina, from December 2011 to July 2017, having first been elected in 2011 and reelected in 2013 and 2015. Thomas stepped down in July 2017 to take the position of executive director of the Global Transpark in Kinston, North Carolina. He was appointed by North Carolina Governor Roy Cooper. He is a member of the Democratic Party.

In 2019, Thomas ran for a seat in the U.S. House in North Carolina's 3rd congressional district's special election. Thomas won the Democratic nomination, but lost the general election.

Education

Thomas attended East Carolina University in the late 1980s and the early 1990s. He successfully petitioned the Council of Governments for funding and authored the Eastern North Carolina Source Guide to Scholarships and Grants which was published for several years and sent to high school students across the state. As an undergraduate, he was elected student body president at East Carolina University and worked as a liaison for the university with then-Mayor Nancy Jenkins and the Greenville City Council. Thomas received his undergraduate degree in business management. Upon graduation, he attended the University of North Carolina at Chapel Hill, where he received his Masters of Business Administration. Thomas went on to volunteer for Governor Jim Hunt and was eventually hired by the North Carolina Commerce department.

Career

Thomas returned to Greenville, and in 2003 he was hired as a consultant by East Carolina University where he developed and created the "Purple Alert" system. This system organized thousands of East Carolina University alumni from a cross North Carolina to lobby their local senators and representatives to vote for the funding for the East Carolina Heart Institute in 2004. The Heart Hospital now stands at Vidant Medical Center in Greenville. Allen was appointed to the Greenville Board of Adjustment and then the Greenville Planning & Zoning Commission where he was elected Chairman.

Thomas has served on the East Carolina Board of Trustees, Board of Visitors and the ECU Alumni Board. He was appointed by Governor Mike Easley to the North Carolina Senior Advisory Council for Economic Development. He was appointed as Commissioner by Governor Beverly Perdue to the 3-person panel overseeing the North Carolina Alcoholic Beverage Commission. Thomas also served on the Executive Council of Metro Mayors, an organization for the largest cities in North Carolina.

Thomas was elected as Mayor of Greenville in 2011, and served until July 2017, winning re-election in 2013 and 2015. During this time, he oversaw the rapid growth and expansion of the city, and the aftermath of Hurricane Matthew in October 2016. Thomas stepped down in July 2017, when he accepted an appointment to be the executive director of the Global Transpark. In March 2019, Thomas left the Global Transpark to run for Congress.  After Thomas's departure, North Carolina State Auditor, Beth Wood, released a report finding "significant misstatements" in the Global Transpark's financial reporting, covering the fiscal year when Thomas was named the executive director.

2019 U.S. House campaign
Thomas was a candidate for Congress in the 2019 North Carolina's 3rd congressional district special election, held after former Representative Walter B. Jones Jr. died in office. On April 30, 2019, he won the Democratic primary and advanced to the September 10 general election, but lost to State Representative Greg Murphy, the Republican nominee.

Personal life
Thomas is married and has three children.

References

1969 births
Living people
People from Greenville, North Carolina
Mayors of places in North Carolina
North Carolina Democrats
Candidates in the 2019 United States elections